The Association of British Neurologists is a professional organisation founded in 1932 and expanded to include overseas membership in 1937.

At 31 December 2014 there were 740 ordinary members, 204 senior members, 24 honorary members, 50 honorary foreign members, 70 overseas members, 385 associate members and 29 affiliate members. It is an active member of the Neurological Alliance and holds an annual conference. The current (2017 - 2019) President is Mary Reilly.

The Association produces guidelines for the treatment of neurological conditions.

In December 2014, the Association produced a national study of neurological services in 195 acute hospitals, which compared their services against the best practice standards set by the association. It showed “dramatic” variations in access to daily neurological consultations. None of the hospitals where neurologists were based provided seven-day access to consultants, and only 49% provided access to consultants 5 days per week.

Arms

See also
 Society of British Neurological Surgeons

References

External links

Punicic Acid's Role in the Prevention of Neurological Disorders

1932 establishments in the United Kingdom
Health charities in the United Kingdom
Health in the London Borough of Camden
Medical and health organisations based in London
Medical associations based in the United Kingdom
Neurology organizations
Organisations based in the London Borough of Camden
Scientific organizations established in 1989